Jirattikan Vapilai (born Nov 23, 1997) is a Thai professional footballer who plays as an attacking midfielder.

Club career

Leicester City
In youth career he was trained for 2 years and a half at Leicester City in England.

References

https://us.soccerway.com/players/jirattikan-vapilai/597026/

1997 births
Living people
Jirattikan Vapilai
Association football midfielders
Thai expatriate sportspeople in the United Kingdom
Thai expatriate sportspeople in Belgium
Jirattikan Vapilai
Jirattikan Vapilai